Alfred Jesse Suenson-Taylor, 1st Baron Grantchester  (14 August 1893 – 2 July 1976), was a British banker, Liberal politician and a neo-liberal activist.

Born Alfred Jesse Taylor, he was the son of Alfred George Taylor of Stowford, Surrey. His younger brother was Charles Taylor. He was educated at Epsom College and King's College, Cambridge, and served at Gallipoli and in France during the First World War, reaching the rank of Major.

Political career
He stood for parliament as a Liberal Party candidate four times. He was unsuccessful on each occasion:

In 1947 Suenson-Taylor played a significant role in gaining Bank of England support for the emergent Mont Pelerin Society. He was later President of the London Liberal Party. On 30 June 1953, he was raised to the peerage as Baron Grantchester, of Knightsbridge in the City of Westminster. Grantchester served as Chairman of the London and Manchester Assurance Company from 1953 to 1961, as Joint Honorary Treasurer of the Liberal Party Organisation from 1953 to 1962 and as President of the Society for Individual Freedom. He also initiated the unofficial meetings of the EFTA parliamentarians at Strasbourg and was a Delegate to the Assemblies of the Council of Europe and the Western European Union.

Family life
He married Mara Henrietta (Mamie), daughter of Albert Suenson of Copenhagen in Denmark, in 1920, and assumed the surname of Suenson in addition to that of Taylor. He died in July 1976, aged 82, and was succeeded in the barony by his son Kenneth. His wife died the same year.

References

Kidd, Charles, Williamson, David (editors). Debrett's Peerage and Baronetage (1990 edition). New York: St Martin's Press, 1990.

Summary of Lord Grantchester's career

1893 births
1976 deaths
People educated at Epsom College
Alumni of King's College, Cambridge
Liberal Party (UK) hereditary peers
Officers of the Order of the British Empire
Hereditary barons created by Elizabeth II